Joseph Miitamariki (born 14 August 1988) in Cook Islands is a footballer who plays as a defender. He currently plays for Tupapa Maraerenga in the Cook Islands League and the Cook Islands national football team.

Career statistics

International

Statistics accurate as of match played 26 November 2011

Honours
Tupapa Maraerenga
Cook Islands Round Cup (5): 2007, 2010, 2011, 2012, 2014
Cook Islands Cup (2): 2009, 2013

References

1988 births
Living people
Cook Islands international footballers
Association football defenders
Cook Island footballers